George Emlen Hare (1808–1892) was an American Episcopal clergyman, born in Philadelphia.

He graduated at Union College in 1826, was rector of St. John's, Carlisle, Pa. (1830–34), of Trinity Church, Princeton, N. J., (1834–43), and of St. Matthew's Church, Francisville, Philadelphia (1845–52).  In 1844–45 he was a professor of Latin and Greek at the University of Pennsylvania.  He had had charge of the Episcopal Academy during a part of his pastorate at St. Matthew's and was made instructor in the diocesan training school and, after its development into the Philadelphia Divinity School, a professor of biblical learning, and then (1881) of New Testament literature in the latter institution.  He wrote Christ to Return (1840) and a volume of sermons, Visions and Narratives of the Old Testament (1889).

Personal and family life
Hare married Elizabeth Catherine Hobart, daughter of the Rt. Rev. Hobart, at St. John's Chapel, New York, New York. 

 

American religious writers
Clergy from Philadelphia
19th-century American Episcopal priests
1808 births
1892 deaths
Union College (New York) alumni
University of Pennsylvania faculty